The 24th Senate of Puerto Rico was the upper house of the 16th Legislative Assembly of Puerto Rico that met from January 2, 2009, to January 1, 2013. All members were elected in the General Elections of 2008. The Senate had a majority of members from the New Progressive Party (PNP).

The body is counterparted by the 28th House of Representatives of Puerto Rico in the lower house.

Leadership

Members

Summary

Membership

References

24
2009 in Puerto Rico
2010 in Puerto Rico
2011 in Puerto Rico
2012 in Puerto Rico
2013 in Puerto Rico